Coby Joseph Karl (born June 8, 1983) is an American former professional basketball player who is the  head coach of the Delaware Blue Coats of the NBA G League. He is the son of NBA head coach George Karl.

High school career
Karl attended Homestead High School in Mequon, Wisconsin, and lettered in basketball. He was an All-Suburban selection, a first team All-Conference selection, and an All-State Honorable Mention selection as a senior. Karl graduated in 2002.

College career
Karl played basketball at Boise State while majoring in Mass Communications. The  shooting guard led the Broncos in points (17.2) and assists (4.0) as a junior, and he averaged 14.8 points and 4.0 assists during his senior season en route to First Team All-WAC honors in 2007.

Karl had weighed whether to return to college for his senior year or to enter the 2006 NBA Draft, attending a few pre-draft workouts for various professional teams. However, he decided to return to college.

Professional career
Karl was not drafted by an NBA team, but made the Lakers' 15-man roster as a free agent. Karl made his NBA debut on October 30, 2007, with the Lakers versus the Houston Rockets, playing 37 seconds and registering no statistics. He was assigned to the Los Angeles D-Fenders of the NBA Development League.

On February 19, 2008, Karl joined Lakers' second-year guard Jordan Farmar as the only other player in league history to see action in same-day D-League and NBA games.

Karl was then recalled from the Los Angeles D-Fenders for the third time that season, which is the most any player can be recalled in one season.

In April 2008, the Los Angeles Lakers played the Denver Nuggets in the first round of the 2008 NBA Playoffs, Karl and his father became the first father and son to ever oppose each other in the NBA playoffs. Karl was a reserve for the Lakers, and his father was the head coach for the Nuggets. Karl was released by Los Angeles on October 27, 2008.

Karl joined the Spanish pro club Joventut Badalona of the Liga ACB in January 2009.

In September 2009, Karl reached an agreement to attend training camp with the Cleveland Cavaliers, where he competed for a regular-season roster spot. On October 22, 2009 the Cavaliers made three final cuts, ensuring Karl a spot on their opening day roster. The Cavaliers waived Karl on January 6, 2010, sending him to free agency.

On January 30, 2010, Karl was signed to a 10-day contract by the Golden State Warriors. After his stint with the Warriors, he returned to the NBA D-League as a member of the Idaho Stampede.

On April 11, 2010, Karl was signed to the Nuggets to an undisclosed contract. He was waived by the Nuggets on August 16, 2010.

In September 2010, he returned to play in Spain, signing a one-year contract with CB Granada.

In May 2011, after being relegated to the second division in Spain with CB Granada, he signed with Armani Jeans Milano in Italy until the end of the season.

In September 2011, he signed with Fabi Shoes Montegranaro in Lega Basket Serie A in Italy.

In October 2012, Karl rejoined the Idaho Stampede.

On July 30, 2013, Karl signed with Pallacanestro Reggiana of Italy. He left them in December 2013. He then signed with MHP Riesen Ludwigsburg. On March 12, he left Riesen Ludwigsburg with the intent of going to the D-League. On March 17, 2015,  he signed with Reno and made his debut. On August 21, 2015, Karl retired.

Coaching career
On October 27, 2015, Karl was hired as an assistant coach by the Westchester Knicks, the NBA Development League affiliate of the New York Knicks. Westchester made significant improvement during the one season Karl spent on the bench, upping its record from 10-40 in 2014-15 to a 28-22 mark during the 2015-16 campaign.

On September 12, 2016, Karl took over his first head coaching role with the NBA D-League's Los Angeles D-Fenders, the affiliate team of the Lakers. He was not retained by the organization prior to the 2021–22 season.

On September 28, 2021, Karl became the new head coach of the Delaware Blue Coats.

Thyroid cancer
Karl also underwent radioactive iodine treatment, a painless and simple outpatient treatment, for papillary carcinoma, a thyroid cancer considered by doctors to be one of the most treatable forms of cancer. After his senior year, Karl again had another surgery to remove cancerous cells. His father left the Nuggets to be with his son during the seven-hour surgery and returned to the team after the completion of the surgery.

NBA career statistics

Regular season

|-
| align="left" | 
| align="left" | L.A. Lakers
| 17 || 0 || 4.2 || .346 || .308 || .800 || .8 || .5 || .2 || .1 || 1.8
|-
| align="left" | 
| align="left" | Cleveland
| 3 || 0 || 1.7 || .000 || .000 || .000 || .7 || .0 || .0 || .0 || .0
|-
| align="left" | 
| align="left" | Golden State
| 4 || 1 || 27.0 || .344 || .182 || .667 || 4.0 || 3.8 || .8 || .3 || 7.0
|-
| align="left" | Career
| align="left" |
| 24 || 1 || 7.6 || .345 || .250 || .750 || 1.3 || 1.0 || .3 || .1 || 2.4

Playoffs

|-
| align="left" | 2008
| align="left" | L.A. Lakers
| 1 || 0 || 2.0 || .000 || .000 || .000 || .0 || 1.0 || .0 || .0 || .0
|-
| align="left" | Career
| align="left" |
| 1 || 0 || 2.0 || .000 || .000 || .000 || .0 || 1.0 || .0 || .0 || .0

Notes

External links

NBA D-League player profile
ACB.com profile

1983 births
Living people
American expatriate basketball people in Germany
American expatriate basketball people in Italy
American expatriate basketball people in Spain
American men's basketball players
Basketball coaches from Montana
Basketball coaches from Wisconsin
Basketball players from Montana
Basketball players from Wisconsin
Boise State Broncos men's basketball players
CB Granada players
Cleveland Cavaliers players
Golden State Warriors players
Idaho Stampede players
Joventut Badalona players
Liga ACB players
Los Angeles Lakers players
Los Angeles D-Fenders coaches
Los Angeles D-Fenders players
Olimpia Milano players
Pallacanestro Reggiana players
People from Mequon, Wisconsin
Reno Bighorns players
Riesen Ludwigsburg players
Shooting guards
South Bay Lakers coaches
Sportspeople from Great Falls, Montana
Sportspeople from the Milwaukee metropolitan area
Undrafted National Basketball Association players